Gabrielle Hilda Blunt (8 January 1919 – 10 June 2014) was a British actress. She had a very long career in theatre, film and television mainly working as a character actress appearing in many British television programmes and films.

Biography
Blunt was the daughter and only child of Henry Wilfrid Blunt (born 17 May 1887, died 13 October 1956) and Maud Etta Hyde (born 1890, died 1976) who were married on 10 May 1915. She was the granddaughter of Sir John Harvey Blunt, eighth Baronet Blunt of London (born 1 January 1839, died 26 January 1922) and Susan Hoad (born 1843, died 1 April 1917).

Blunt began her theatrical career in regional rep in the early 1940s touring Europe with the Entertainments National Service Association in 1945. The same year, she was seen in Vanbrugh's The Confederacy at the York Festival.

Blunt's first significant role was as Catriona Macroon in the film Whisky Galore!. In the early 1990s she appeared in a documentary about the film Whisky Galore, which was later also on a DVD release of the original 1949 film.

Blunt also appeared as Mrs Bulstrode in the Wilt, a 1989 adaptation of Tom Sharpe's novel. She became best known for her roles in British sitcoms, appearing over the years in Happy Ever After, Shine on Harvey Moon, Roll Over Beethoven, Drop the Dead Donkey, The Fast Show, Pat & Margaret, Harry Enfield's Television Programme and Paul Merton: The Series and The Thin Blue Line.

She appeared in an early episode of the popular BBC sitcom One Foot in the Grave as Mrs Birkett, an elderly neighbour who accidentally gets trapped in the Meldrews' loft when Victor closes the trap door whilst she is up there looking for jumble that Margaret has prepared for her. She continues to be mentioned throughout the rest of the series, but is not seen again.

When she was nearly 80, in 1998, Blunt toured the UK and Europe in Out of Joint's premiere of Caryl Churchill's Blue Heart and she travelled to New York the following year to perform in it.

Blunt was married and divorced twice and had three children. Her first husband was the actor Tony Thawnton. Her second husband, Julian Bond, adopted her two children from her first marriage.

She continued to work in television and theatre until the early 2000s. Her final appearance on television was in November 2001 in an episode of the series Heartbeat.

She died at the age of 95 of natural causes in the actors' retirement home Denville Hall in London, England, on 10 June 2014.

Filmography

References

External links 

1919 births
2014 deaths
British film actresses
British television actresses
People from Blean